Jordan Bernt Peterson (born 12 June 1962) is a Canadian psychologist, author, and media commentator. He began to receive widespread attention in the late 2010s for his views on cultural and political issues, often described as conservative. Peterson has described himself as a classic British liberal and a traditionalist.

Born and raised in Alberta, Peterson obtained bachelor's degrees in political science and psychology from the University of Alberta and a PhD in clinical psychology from McGill University. After researching and teaching at Harvard University, he returned to Canada in 1998 and became a professor of psychology at the University of Toronto. In 1999, he published his first book, Maps of Meaning: The Architecture of Belief, which became the basis for many of his subsequent lectures. The book combines psychology, mythology, religion, literature, philosophy and neuroscience to analyze systems of belief and meaning.

In 2016, Peterson released a series of YouTube videos criticizing the Act to amend the Canadian Human Rights Act and the Criminal Code (Bill C-16), passed by the Parliament of Canada to introduce "gender identity and expression" as prohibited grounds for discrimination. Peterson claimed that the bill would make the use of certain gender pronouns, "compelled speech", and related this argument to a general critique of political correctness and identity politics. He received significant media coverage, attracting both support and criticism. 

In 2018, he paused both his clinical practice and teaching duties and published his second book: 12 Rules for Life: An Antidote to Chaos. Promoted with a world tour, it became a bestseller in several countries. Throughout 2019 and 2020, Peterson suffered health problems in the aftermath of severe benzodiazepine withdrawal syndrome. In 2021, he published his third book, Beyond Order: 12 More Rules for Life, resigned from the University of Toronto, and returned to podcasting. In 2022, Peterson signed a content distribution deal with conservative media company The Daily Wire and became Chancellor of Ralston College. His various lectures and conversations, propagated mainly through YouTube and podcasts, have gathered millions of views.

Early life 
Peterson was born on 12 June 1962, in Edmonton, Alberta, and grew up in Fairview, a small town in the northwest of the province. He was the eldest of three children born to Walter and Beverley Peterson. Beverley was a librarian at the Fairview campus of Grande Prairie Regional College, and Walter was a school teacher. His middle name is Bernt, after his Norwegian great-grandfather. Peterson grew up in a mildly Christian household.

In junior high school, Peterson became friends with Rachel Notley and her family. Notley became leader of the Alberta New Democratic Party and the 17th premier of Alberta. Peterson was a member of the New Democratic Party (NDP) from ages 13 to 18. As a teenager, Peterson decided that "religion was for the ignorant, weak and superstitious" and hoped for a left-wing revolution, a hope that lasted until he met left-wing activists in college.

As a young man, Peterson became obsessed with the Cold War and the possibility of a nuclear apocalypse.

Education 
After graduating from Fairview High School in 1979, Peterson entered Grande Prairie Regional College to study political science and English literature, studying to be a corporate lawyer. During this time he read The Road to Wigan Pier by George Orwell, which significantly affected his educational focus and worldview. He later transferred to the University of Alberta, where he completed his BA in political science in 1982. Afterwards, he took a year off to visit Europe, where he began studying the psychological origins of the Cold War; 20th-century European totalitarianism; and the works of Carl Jung, Friedrich Nietzsche, Aleksandr Solzhenitsyn, and Fyodor Dostoevsky.

Peterson then returned to the University of Alberta and received a BA in psychology in 1984. In 1985, he moved to Montreal to attend McGill University where he earned his PhD in clinical psychology under the supervision of Robert O. Pihl in 1991, and remained as a post-doctoral fellow at McGill's Douglas Hospital until June 1993, working with Pihl and Maurice Dongier.

While at McGill University and the Douglas Hospital, Peterson conducted research into familial alcoholism and its associated psychopathologies, such as childhood and adolescent aggression and hyperactive behaviour.

Career 

From July 1993 to June 1998, Peterson lived in Arlington, Massachusetts, while teaching and conducting research at Harvard University, where he was hired as an assistant professor in the psychology department, later becoming an associate professor. During his time at Harvard, he studied aggression arising from drug and alcohol abuse. An article in The Harvard Crimson said he possessed a "willingness to take on any research project, no matter how unconventional". While at Harvard, he switched his primary area of research from familial alcoholism to personality and authored several academic papers. Author Gregg Hurwitz, a former student of Peterson's at Harvard, has cited Peterson as an inspiration of his, and psychologist Shelley Carson, former PhD student and now-professor at Harvard, recalled that Peterson's lectures had "something akin to a cult following", stating, "I remember students crying on the last day of class because they wouldn't get to hear him anymore." Following his associate position at Harvard, Peterson returned to Canada in 1998 to become a full professor at the University of Toronto.

Peterson's areas of study and research within the fields of psychology are psychopharmacology, abnormal, neuro, clinical, personality, social, industrial and organizational, religious, ideological, political, and creativity. Peterson has authored or co-authored more than a hundred academic papers and was cited almost 8,000 times as of mid-2017 and more than 18,000 times as of 2022.

Beginning in 2003, Peterson appeared on television, speaking on a subject from a psychological perspective. On TVOntario, he appeared on Big Ideas in 2003 and 2006, and in a 13-part lecture series based on Maps of Meaning, aired in 2004. In a 2007 BBC Horizon documentary, Mad but Glad, Peterson commented on the connection between pianist Nick van Bloss' Tourette syndrome diagnosis and his musical talent.
From 2011, TVOntario's The Agenda featured Peterson as an essayist and panelist on psychologically relevant cultural issues.

For most of his career, Peterson maintained a clinical practice, seeing about 20 people a week. He has been active on social media, and in September 2016 he released a series of videos in which he criticized Bill C-16. As a result of new projects, he decided to put the clinical practice on hold in 2017 and temporarily stopped teaching as of 2018. In February 2018, Peterson entered into a promise with the College of Psychologists of Ontario after a professional misconduct complaint about his communication and the boundaries he sets with his patients. The college did not consider a full disciplinary hearing necessary and accepted Peterson entering into a three-month undertaking to work on prioritizing his practice and improving his patient communications. Peterson had no prior disciplinary punishments or restrictions on his clinical practice. In 2023, the college ordered Peterson to undergo social media communication coaching, following concerns about his public comments. Peterson denied any wrongdoing and filed for judicial review.

Regarding the topic of religion and God, Bret Weinstein moderated a debate between Peterson and Sam Harris at the Orpheum Theatre in Vancouver in June 2018. In July, the two debated the subject again, this time moderated by Douglas Murray, at the 3Arena in Dublin and The O2 Arena in London. In April 2019, Peterson debated Slavoj Žižek at the Sony Centre in Toronto over happiness under capitalism versus Marxism.

In the fall of 2021, Peterson resigned from the employment of the University of Toronto, becoming professor emeritus. In May 2022, he became chancellor of Ralston College, a liberal arts education project.

Works

Books

Maps of Meaning (1999) 

In 1999, Routledge published Maps of Meaning: The Architecture of Belief, in which Peterson describes a comprehensive theory about how people construct meaning, form beliefs, and make narratives. The book, which took Peterson 13 years to complete, draws concepts from various fields including mythology, religion, literature, philosophy, and psychology, in accordance to the modern scientific understanding of how the brain functions.

According to Peterson, his main goal was to examine why individuals and groups alike participate in social conflict, exploring the reasoning and motivation individuals take to support their belief systems (i.e. ideological identification) that eventually result in killing and pathological atrocities such as the Gulag, the Auschwitz concentration camp, and the Rwandan genocide. Influenced by Jung's archetypal view of the collective unconscious in the book, Peterson says that an "analysis of the world's religious ideas might allow us to describe our essential morality and eventually develop a universal system of morality."

In 2004, a 13-part TV miniseries based on Peterson's book aired on TVOntario.

12 Rules for Life (2018) 

In January 2018, Penguin Random House published Peterson's second book, 12 Rules for Life: An Antidote to Chaos, in which self-help principles are discussed in a more accessible style than in his previous published work. The book topped best-selling lists in Australia, Canada, France, Germany, the US, and the United Kingdom.

To promote the book, Peterson embarked on a world tour.

Beyond Order (2021) 

Peterson's third book, Beyond Order: 12 More Rules for Life, was released on 2 March 2021. On 23 November 2020, his publisher Penguin Random House Canada (PRH Canada) held an internal town hall where many employees criticized the decision to publish the book.

Social media 

In 2013, Peterson registered a YouTube channel named JordanPetersonVideos, and immediately began uploading recordings of lectures and interviews. The earliest dated recordings are from Harvard lectures in 1996. By the end of 2013, content on the channel included the lectures from Harvard, some interviews, and additional special lectures on two defining topics: "Tragedy vs Evil" and "Psychology as a career".

From 2014, uploads include recordings from two of his classes at University of Toronto ("Personality and Its Transformations" and "Maps of Meaning: The Architecture of Belief"), special lectures ("Potential" for TEDx, "Death of the Oceans"), interviews, experiments in Q&A format, and video essays.

In March 2016, after three years of basic uploading of course videos, Peterson announced an interest to clean existing content and improve future content, including a new experiment in crowdfunding through Patreon.

The channel gathered more than 1.8 million subscribers and his videos received more than 65 million views as of August 2018. By January 2021, subscribers on JordanPetersonVideos numbered at 3.4 million and total views reached over 200 million.

From early 2017, funding for projects dramatically increased through his use of Patreon. Peterson hired a production team to film his 2017 psychology lectures at the University of Toronto. Donations received range from $1,000 per month in August 2016 to $14,000 by January 2017; more than $50,000 by July 2017; and over $80,000 by May 2018. With this funding, a number of projects and lecture series were proposed: more interviews, regular live Q&A sessions, public lecture series on the Bible, conversations with Muslims in Canada and the US, and an online university. From May through December 2017, a lecture series on biblical stories was recorded and released on YouTube. A series of live Q&A events, appearing approximately monthly, were released beginning April 2017, through January 2018, then shifting to an irregular schedule through 2019. Regular donations for the YouTube channel were interrupted in January 2019, when Peterson deleted his Patreon account in public protest of the platform's controversial banning of another content creator, Carl Benjamin (also known as Sargon of Akkad). Following this, Peterson and Dave Rubin announced the creation of a new, free speech–oriented social networking and crowdfunding platform. This alternative had a limited release under the name Thinkspot later in 2019, and remained in beta testing as of December 2019.

Peterson has appeared on many podcasts, conversational series, as well as other online shows. In December 2016, Peterson started The Jordan B. Peterson Podcast. In March 2019, the podcast joined the Westwood One network with Peterson's daughter as a co-host on some episodes. Peterson defended engineer James Damore after he was fired from Google for writing Google's Ideological Echo Chamber. In January 2022, Peterson was interviewed by Joe Rogan on The Joe Rogan Experience. During the interview, Peterson claimed that the Earth's climate is too complicated to accurately model. Several climate scientists criticized Peterson, saying that he misunderstood climate modelling.

On 29 June 2022, Peterson's Twitter account was suspended under the site's "hateful conduct policy" after posting a tweet misgendering and deadnaming transgender actor Elliot Page. Peterson said he was notified that he would be required to delete the tweet in order to restore access to his account, which he said he "would rather die than do". YouTube has demonetized two of Peterson's videos, one about his Twitter suspension and another video where he said gender-affirming care was "Nazi medical experiment-level wrong." Peterson's Twitter account was restored in November 2022 after Elon Musk acquired the company.

Also in June 2022, Peterson signed a deal with the news company The Daily Wire, which includes the distribution rights to Peterson's video and podcast library. Peterson will also produce bonus content and specials featuring guests for the video on demand platform DailyWire+.

In March 2023, Peterson shared on social media a fictitious detransition story which falsely depicted a YouTube political commentator as an ex-transgender man. During the same week in which Peterson shared the fictitious detransitioning story, Peterson also retweeted a pornographic BDSM video filmed in the United Kingdom that according to its uploader was footage of a sperm bank in China, stating, "Such fun in unbelievable techno-nightmare CCP hell." Peterson subsequently deleted the retweet of the BDSM video.

Biblical lectures 

In May 2017, Peterson began The Psychological Significance of the Biblical Stories, a series of live theatre lectures, also published as podcasts, in which he analyzes archetypal narratives in the Book of Genesis as patterns of behaviour ostensibly vital for personal, social and cultural stability. A second series of lectures on the Book of Exodus released on DailyWire+ in November 2022, and another series on the Book of Proverbs has been announced.

In March 2019, Cambridge University rescinded a visiting fellowship invitation to Peterson. He had previously said the fellowship would give him an "opportunity to talk to religious experts of all types for a couple of months," and that the new lectures would have been on the Book of Exodus. A spokesperson for the university said there was no place for anyone who could not uphold the inclusive environment of the university. Vice-Chancellor Stephen Toope explained that a photograph of Peterson with his arm around a man wearing a shirt reading "I'm a proud Islamophobe" led the faculty to the rescindment due to a conflict between Peterson's "casual endorsement by association" and the school's commitment to interfaith dialogue. The Cambridge University Students' Union released a statement of relief, considering the invitation "a political act to ... legitimise figures such as Peterson" and that his work and views are not "representative of the student body." Peterson called the decision a "deeply unfortunate ... error of judgement" and expressed regret that the Divinity Faculty had submitted to an "ill-informed, ignorant and ideologically-addled mob."

Self-Authoring Suite 
In 2005, Peterson, with colleagues Daniel M. Higgins and Robert O. Pihl, established a website and company to deliver an evolving writing therapy system called The Self-Authoring Suite. It consists of a series of online writing programs: the Past Authoring Program (a guided autobiography); two Present Authoring Programs, which aids analysis of personality faults and virtues; and the Future Authoring Program, which aids in developing a vision and planning desired futures.

To understand the statistical benefits of the suite academic trials have been conducted, and several studies published. Peterson states that more than 10,000 students have used the program, with drop-out rates decreasing by 25 per cent and grade point averages rising by 20 per cent.

The Future Authoring program has been used with McGill University undergraduates on academic probation to improve grades, and since 2011 by the Rotterdam School of Management, Erasmus University.

A 2015 study published in Palgrave Communications showed a significant reduction in ethnic and gender-group differences in performance, especially among ethnic minority male students. In 2020, the Higher Education Quality Council of Ontario (HEQCO) published a study within its Access and Retention Consortium. As HEQCO (with ARC) is an agency of Ontario government, this study represents published research for broader public awareness and application. To support this, several institutions were represented in the research: Mohawk College, University of Ottawa, University of Toronto, Queens University. The program was tested at Mohawk College, and found similar results as with other studies.

Views 

Peterson has characterized himself politically as a "classic British liberal" and a "traditionalist". He has stated that he is commonly mistaken as right-wing. Peterson supports universal healthcare, redistribution of wealth towards the poor and the decriminalisation of drugs.

The New York Times described Peterson as "conservative-leaning", and The Washington Post described him as an "aspiring conservative thought leader". Yoram Hazony wrote in The Wall Street Journal that
 "[t]he startling success of his elevated arguments for the importance of order has made him the most significant conservative thinker to appear in the English-speaking world in a generation."

Wall Street Journal editorial page writer Barton Swaim wrote,
 "I wouldn't describe [Peterson] as a conservative—his interest lies in individual rather than societal order, and he says little about public policy. But it's true that he not infrequently winds up holding conservative viewpoints on cultural matters."

The American Conservative wrote that, while Peterson has
 "abjured any connection to modern liberalism or conservatism ... the biggest tell that Peterson is a conservative is simply that his general disposition toward life and society is conservative."

In the Los Angeles Times, libertarian journalist Cathy Young commented that
 "Peterson's ideas are a mixed bag: He says some sensible and insightful things, and he says some things that rightly draw criticism. But you wouldn't know this from reading Peterson's critics, who generally cast him as a far-right boogeyman riding the wave of a misogynistic backlash. That's a mistake."

Nathan J. Robinson of the left-wing magazine Current Affairs writes that Peterson has been seen 
"as everything from a fascist apologist to an Enlightenment liberal, because his vacuous words are a kind of Rorschach test onto which countless interpretations can be projected." 

Helen Lewis commented that Peterson
 "is, in many ways, countercultural. He doesn't offer get-rich-quick schemes, or pick-up techniques. He is not libertine or libertarian. He promises that life is a struggle, but that it is ultimately worthwhile."

Academia and political correctness 

Peterson suggests that universities are largely responsible for a wave of political correctness that has appeared in North America and Europe, saying that he had watched the rise of political correctness on campuses since the early 1990s. Peterson believes the humanities have become corrupt and less reliant on science, in particular sociology. He contends that "proper culture" has been undermined by "post-modernism and neo-Marxism."

Peterson's critiques of political correctness range over issues such as postmodernism, postmodern feminism, white privilege, cultural appropriation, and environmentalism. His social media presence has magnified the impact of these views; Simona Chiose of The Globe and Mail wrote that "few University of Toronto professors in the humanities and social sciences have enjoyed the global name recognition Prof. Peterson has won." Writing in the National Post, Chris Selley said that Peterson's opponents had:
  

Tim Lott stated in The Spectator that Peterson became "an outspoken critic of mainstream academia."

Psychologist Daniel Burston has critiqued Peterson's views on academia. On Marxism, postmodernism and feminism, Burston faults Peterson's thought as oversimplified. On the general state of academia, Burston generally agrees with Peterson's criticisms of identity politics in academia,
as well as with Peterson's charge that academia is "riddled with Left-wing bias and political correctness". On summarizing the decline of the university, Burston disagrees with Peterson's critique against the Left, arguing that Peterson overlooks the degree to which the current decline of the humanities and social sciences is due to university administration focus.

Postmodernism and identity politics 
Peterson has argued that "disciplines like women's studies should be defunded", advising freshman students to avoid subjects such as sociology, anthropology, English literature, ethnic studies, and racial studies, as well as other fields of study that he believes are corrupted by "post-modern neo-Marxists". He believes these fields propagate cult-like behaviour and safe-spaces, under the pretense of academic inquiry.

Peterson had proposed a website using artificial intelligence to identify ideologization in specific courses, but postponed the project in November 2017 as "it might add excessively to current polarization".

He has repeatedly stated his opposition to identity politics, stating that it is practiced on both sides of the political divide: "[t]he left plays them on behalf of the oppressed, let's say, and the right tends to play them on behalf of nationalism and ethnic pride". He considers both equally dangerous, saying that what should be emphasized, instead, is individual focus and personal responsibility. He has also been prominent in the debate about cultural appropriation, stating that the concept promotes self-censorship in society and journalism.

Peterson has used the terms "Cultural Marxism" and "postmodernism" interchangeably to describe the influence of postmodernism on North American humanities departments and he views postmodern philosophy as an offshoot or expression of neo-Marxism.

Several writers have associated Peterson with the so-called "intellectual dark web", including journalist Bari Weiss, who included Peterson in the 2018 New York Times article that first popularized the term.

Gender and gender expression 
Peterson has argued that there is an ongoing "crisis of masculinity" and "backlash against masculinity" in which the "masculine spirit is under assault". He has argued that the Left characterizes the existing societal hierarchy as an "oppressive patriarchy" but "doesn't want to admit that the current hierarchy might be predicated on competence." He has said men without partners are likely to become violent, and that male violence is reduced in societies in which monogamy is a social norm. He has attributed the rise of Donald Trump and far-right European politicians to what he says is a negative reaction to a push to "feminize" men, saying "If men are pushed too hard to feminize they will become more and more interested in harsh, fascist political ideology."

In 2018, he attracted attention in the UK after a Channel 4 News interview with Cathy Newman on the gender pay gap, in which he disputed the idea that the pay gap is solely due to sexual discrimination. The video led to threats and harassment of Newman, and Peterson called for his supporters to be more civil.

Peterson believes that order is masculine and chaos is feminine, and that these qualities are inherent to human existence. To Peterson, culture is "symbolically, archetypally, mythically male," while "chaos—the unknown—is symbolically associated with the feminine."

Peterson has said that "gay kids are being convinced they're transsexual. Well that's not so good for gay people, is it?" and that "there's certainly a lot of confused adolescents who could be enticed into narcissistic abnormality as a consequence of attention-seeking."

Bill C-16 

On 27 September 2016, Peterson released the first installment of a three-part lecture video series, entitled "Professor against political correctness: Part I: Fear and the Law". In the video, he stated that he would not use the preferred gender pronouns of students and faculty, saying it fell under compelled speech, and announced his objection to the Canadian government's Bill C-16, which proposed to add "gender identity or expression" as a prohibited ground of discrimination under the Canadian Human Rights Act, and to similarly expand the definitions of promoting genocide and publicly inciting hatred in the hate speech laws in Canada.

Peterson stated that his objection to the bill was based on potential free-speech implications if the Criminal Code were amended, saying he could then be prosecuted under provincial human-rights laws if he refused to call a transgender student or faculty member by the individual's preferred pronoun. According to law professor Brenda Cossman and others, this interpretation of C-16 is mistaken, and the law does not criminalize misuse of pronouns, though commercial litigator Jared Brown has described a scenario (albeit one he thinks unlikely) in which a person could end up in prison for contempt of court for persistently refusing to comply with a court order to refer to another person by their preferred gender pronouns.

The series of videos drew criticism from transgender activists, faculty, and labour unions; critics accused Peterson of "helping to foster a climate for hate to thrive" and of "fundamentally mischaracterising" the law. Protests erupted on campus, some including violence, and the controversy attracted international media attention.

When asked in September 2016 if he would comply with the request of a student to use a preferred pronoun, Peterson said "it would depend on how they asked me. ... If I could detect that there was a chip on their shoulder, or that they were [asking me] with political motives, then I would probably say 'no'. ... If I could have a conversation like the one we're having now, I could probably meet them on an equal level." Two months later, the National Post published an op-ed by Peterson in which he elaborated on his opposition to the bill, saying that gender-neutral singular pronouns were "at the vanguard of a post-modern, radical leftist ideology that I detest, and which is, in my professional opinion, frighteningly similar to the Marxist doctrines that killed at least 100 million people in the 20th century."

In response to the controversy, academic administrators at the University of Toronto sent Peterson two letters of warning, one noting that free speech had to be made in accordance with human rights legislation, and the other adding that his refusal to use the preferred personal pronouns of students and faculty upon request could constitute discrimination. Peterson speculated that these warning letters were leading up to formal disciplinary action against him, but in December the university assured him he would retain his professorship, and in January 2017 he returned to teach his psychology class at the University of Toronto.

In February 2017, Maxime Bernier, candidate for leader of the Conservative Party of Canada, stated that he had shifted his position on Bill C-16, from support to opposition, after meeting with Peterson and discussing it. Peterson's analysis of the bill was also frequently cited by senators who were opposed to its passage. In April 2017, Peterson was denied a Social Sciences and Humanities Research Council (SSHRC) grant for the first time in his career, which he interpreted as retaliation for his statements regarding Bill C-16. However, a media-relations adviser for SSHRC said, "Committees assess only the information contained in the application." In response, Rebel News launched an Indiegogo crowdfunding campaign on Peterson's behalf, raising C$195,000 by its end on 6 May, equivalent to over two years of research funding. In May 2017, as one of 24 witnesses who were invited to speak about the bill, Peterson spoke against Bill C-16 at a Canadian Senate Committee on Legal and Constitutional Affairs hearing.

In November 2017, Lindsay Shepherd, the teaching assistant of a Wilfrid Laurier University first-year communications course, was censured by her professors for showing, during a classroom discussion about pronouns, a segment of The Agenda in which Peterson debates Bill C-16 with another professor. The reasons given for the censure included the clip creating a "toxic climate," being compared to a "speech by Hitler," and being itself in violation of Bill C-16. The censure was later withdrawn and both the professors and the university formally apologized. The events were cited by Peterson, as well as several newspaper editorial boards and national newspaper columnists, as illustrative of the suppression of free speech on university campuses. In June 2018, Peterson filed a $1.5-million lawsuit against Wilfrid Laurier University, arguing that three staff members of the university had maliciously defamed him by making negative comments about him behind closed doors.  Wilfrid Laurier had asked the court to dismiss the lawsuit, stating that Peterson filed it in an attempt to limit debate on matters of public interest. Laurier commented that it was ironic for a purported advocate of free speech to attempt to curtail free speech.

Climate change 
Peterson doubts the scientific consensus on climate change, saying he is "very skeptical of the models that are used to predict climate change", and that "you can't trust the data because too much ideology is involved". Appearing on The Joe Rogan Experience in 2022, Peterson claimed that "there is no such thing as climate" and questioned the accuracy of climate modeling. Climate scientists accused Peterson of being "stunningly ignorant" and of confusing weather forecasting with climate modeling. In response to various criticisms, Peterson cited Fred Singer, a climate scientist who rejected the scientific consensus on climate change, as a source. Peterson also defended "automotive freedom" and claimed that excess carbon dioxide is beneficial to the world.

Religion 
In a 2017 interview, Peterson was asked if he was a Christian; he responded, "I suppose the most straight-forward answer to that is yes." When asked if he believes in God, Peterson responded: "I think the proper response to that is no, but I'm afraid He might exist."

Writing for The Spectator, Tim Lott said Peterson draws inspiration from the Jungian interpretation of religion and holds views similar to the Christian existentialism of Søren Kierkegaard and Paul Tillich. Lott also said that Peterson has respect for Taoism, as it views nature as a struggle between order and chaos and posits life would be meaningless without this duality. He has also expressed his admiration for some of the teachings of the Eastern Orthodox Church.

Writing in Psychoanalysis, Politics and the Postmodern University, Daniel Burston argues that Peterson's views on religion reflect a preoccupation with what Tillich calls the vertical or transcendent dimension of religious experience but demonstrate little or no familiarity with (or sympathy for) what Tillich termed the horizontal dimension of faith, which demands social justice in the tradition of the biblical prophets.

Influence 
In 2018, Kelefa Sanneh wrote in The New Yorker that Peterson "is now one of the most influential—and polarizing—public intellectuals in the English-speaking world". In 2022, Mick Brown wrote in The Daily Telegraph that Peterson "has become the most visible, outspoken and certainly the most polarising figure in the 'culture wars' between Left and Right, challenging the new orthodoxies of political correctness that have permeated academia, education, and political and cultural life."

In August 2018, Caitlin Flanagan of The Atlantic argued that Peterson is popular because he "offer[s] an alternative means of understanding the world to a very large group of people who have been starved for one. His audience is huge and ever more diverse, but a significant number of his fans are white men. The automatic assumption of the left is that this is therefore a red-pilled army, but the opposite is true. The alt-right venerates identity politics just as fervently as the left". In contrast, in March 2018, Zack Beauchamp of Vox argued that Peterson is popular because he "is tailor-made to our political moment. His reactionary politics and talents as a public speaker combine to be a perfect fit for YouTube and the right-wing media, where videos of conservatives 'destroying' weak-minded liberals routinely go viral. Peterson's denunciations of identity politics and political correctness are standard-issue conservative, but his academic credentials make his pronouncements feel much more authoritative than your replacement-level Fox News commentator."

During a press tour to promote her 2022  film Don't Worry Darling, Olivia Wilde said the sinister character Frank was inspired by Peterson.  She described him as "this insane man, Jordan Peterson, who is this pseudo-intellectual hero to the incel community." Peterson called the film "the latest bit of propaganda disseminated by the woke, self-righteous bores and bullies who now dominate Hollywood." He also criticized the term "incel", calling it a "casual insult" for men who are "lonesome and they don't know what to do and everyone piles abuse on them."

Personal life 

Starting around 2000, Peterson began collecting Soviet-era paintings. The paintings are displayed in his house as a reminder of the relationship between totalitarian propaganda and art, and as examples of how idealistic visions can become totalitarian oppression and horror. In 2016, Peterson became an honorary member of the extended family of Charles Joseph, a Kwakwaka'wakw artist, and was given the name Alestalagie ("Great Seeker").

Family 
Peterson married Tammy Roberts in 1989, with whom he has a daughter (Mikhaila) and a son (Julian). Mikhaila suffered from juvenile rheumatoid arthritis (JRA) in her childhood, requiring a hip and ankle replacement when she was 17 years old. Mikhaila, who also has a career as a political commentator and podcaster, has since adopted what she calls "the lion diet", consisting entirely of eating only beef, salt, and water. While analyzing Mikhaila's diet and promotion thereof, a 2020 New Republic article by writer Lindsay Beyerstein described her as a "nutrition 'influencer' with no medical credentials". In 2016, Peterson restricted his diet to only meat and a few vegetables in an attempt to control his depression and the effects of an autoimmune disorder. In mid-2018, he stopped eating vegetables altogether and continued eating only beef, salt, and water. Nutrition experts point out that such a diet can result in "severe dysregulation".

Health problems 

In late 2019 Peterson sought "emergency" detox from benzodiazepine addiction. Peterson stated this rehab was the result of his prescribed dosage of clonazepam being increased after his wife Tammy was diagnosed with kidney cancer. According to Peterson, he made several attempts to reduce dosage or stop the drug completely, but experienced "horrific" benzodiazepine withdrawal syndrome.

In January 2020, Peterson was unable to find North American doctors willing to accommodate his treatment desires and so flew to Moscow, Russia along with his daughter, son-in-law, and granddaughter to pursue treatment there. Doctors in Russia diagnosed him with pneumonia in both lungs upon arrival and placed him into a medically induced coma for eight days, followed by four weeks in the intensive care unit, during which time he suffered a temporary loss of motor skills.

Several months after treatment in Russia, Peterson and his family moved to Belgrade, Serbia. In June 2020, Peterson made his first public appearance in over a year, when he appeared on an episode of his daughter's podcast recorded in Belgrade, at which point he was "back to my regular self" and was cautiously optimistic about his prospects.

In August 2020, Peterson's daughter announced her father had contracted COVID-19 during his hospital stay in Serbia. Two months later, Peterson informed viewers of his YouTube channel he had returned to Canada and aimed to resume work in the near future.

Bibliography

Books

Select publications

Film appearances 
 The Rise of Jordan Peterson (2019)
 No Safe Spaces (2019)
 What Is a Woman? (2022)

Notes

References

External links 
 
 

1962 births
Living people
21st-century Canadian male writers
21st-century Canadian non-fiction writers
Activists from Alberta
Canadian classical liberals
Canadian expatriate academics in the United States
Canadian male non-fiction writers
Canadian people of Norwegian descent
Canadian podcasters
Canadian psychologists
Canadian self-help writers
Canadian YouTubers
Clinical psychologists
Conservatism in Canada
Critics of Marxism
Critics of multiculturalism
Critics of postmodernism
Free speech activists
Harvard University faculty
Male critics of feminism
McGill University Faculty of Science alumni
The Daily Wire people
Theorists on Western civilization
University of Alberta alumni
Academic staff of the University of Toronto
Writers from Edmonton